Edmond Pagès (Boulogne-Billancourt, 2 May 1911 — 18 February 1987) was a French professional road bicycle racer. Pagès won a stage in the 1939 Tour de France.

Major results

1939
Tour de France:
Winner stage 6B

External links 

Official Tour de France results for Edmond Pagès

French male cyclists
1911 births
1987 deaths
French Tour de France stage winners
Sportspeople from Boulogne-Billancourt
Cyclists from Île-de-France